Jules Régis Debray (born 2 September 1940) is a French philosopher, journalist, former government official and academic. He is known for his theorization of mediology, a critical theory of the long-term transmission of cultural meaning in human society, and for associating with Marxist revolutionary Che Guevara in Bolivia in 1967 and advancing Salvador Allende's presidency in Chile in the early 1970s. He returned to France in 1973 and later held various official posts in the French government.

Life

1960 to 1973 
Born in Paris, Régis Debray studied at the École Normale Supérieure as taught by Louis Althusser. He appeared as himself in the cinema verité movie Chronique d'un été by Jean Rouch and Edgar Morin in 1960. He became an "agrégé de philosophie" in 1965.

During the late 1960s he was a professor of philosophy at the University of Havana in Cuba, and became an associate of Che Guevara in Bolivia.  He wrote the book Revolution in the Revolution?, which analysed the tactical and strategic doctrines then prevailing among militant socialist movements in Latin America, and acted as a handbook for guerrilla warfare that supplemented Guevara's own manual concerning the topic. It was published in Cuba in the "Cuadernos" collection by Casa de las Americas in 1967, by Maspero in Paris, in New York (Monthly Review Press and Grove Press), Montevideo (Sandino), Milan (Feltrinelli), and Munich (Trikont).

Guevara was captured in Bolivia in October 1967; on 20 April 1967 Debray had been arrested in the small town of Muyupampa, also in Bolivia. Convicted of having been part of Guevara's guerrilla group, Debray was sentenced on 17 November to 30 years in prison. He was released in 1970 after an international campaign for his release which included appeals by Jean-Paul Sartre, André Malraux, General Charles de Gaulle, and Pope Paul VI. He sought refuge in Chile, where he wrote The Chilean Revolution (1972) after interviews with Salvador Allende. Debray returned to France in 1973 following the coup by Augusto Pinochet in Chile.

1981 to 1996 

After the election in France of President François Mitterrand in 1981, he became an official adviser to the Président on Foreign Affairs. In this capacity he developed a policy that sought to increase France's freedom of action in the world, decrease dependence on the United States, and promote closeness with the former colonies. He was also involved in the development of the government's official ceremonies and recognition of the bicentennial of the French Revolution. He resigned in 1988. 

Until the mid-1990s he held a number of official positions in France, including an honorary counselorship at France's supreme administrative court, Conseil d'État.

In 1996, he published a memoir of his life, translated into English as Régis Debray, Praised Be Our Lords (Verso, 2007).

2003 onwards 

Debray was a member of the 2003 Stasi Commission, named for Bernard Stasi, which examined the origins of the 2003 French law on secularity and conspicuous religious symbols in schools. Debray endorsed the 2003 law. This was in defense of French laïcité (separation of church and state) which intends to maintain citizens' equality by the prohibition of religious proselytism in the school system. Debray, however, seems to have encouraged a more subtle treatment of religious issues with regard to school history teaching in France.

Debray is preoccupied with the situation of Christian minorities in the Near East (and with the status of the Holy Places in Jerusalem, Bethlehem and elsewhere), a traditional interest of the French state, and has established an observatory to monitor the situation. His recent work investigates the religious paradigm as a social nexus able to assist collective orientation on a wide, centuries-long scale. This caused him to propose the project of an Institut Européen en Sciences des Religions, a French institute founded in 2005 for monitoring of sociological religious dynamics, and informing the public about religious issues through conferences and publications.

Work: mediology 

Debray is the initiator and chief exponent of the discipline of médiologie or "mediology", which attempts to scientifically study the transmission of cultural meaning in society, whether through language or images.  Mediology is characterized by its multi-disciplinary approach.  It is expounded best in the English-language book Transmitting Culture (Columbia University Press, 2004). In Vie et mort de l'image (Life and Death of Image, 1995), an attempted history of the gaze, he distinguished three regimes of the images (icon, idol and vision). He also strove explicitly to prevent misunderstandings by differentiating mediology from a simple sociology of mass media. He also criticized the basic assumptions of the history of art which present art as an atemporal and universal phenomenon. According to Debray, art is a product of the Renaissance with the invention of the artist as producer of images, in contrast with previous acheiropoieta icons or other types of so-called "art," which did not primarily fulfill an artistic function but rather a religious one.

Current political views 

In a February 2007 opinion-editorial in the newspaper Le Monde, Debray criticized the tendency of the entire French political class towards conservatism. He also deplored the influence of the "videosphere" on modern politics, which he claimed has a tendency to individualize everything, forgetting both past and future (although he praised the loss of 1960s "messianism"), and rejecting any common national project. He criticized the new generation in politics as competent but without character, and lacking ideas: "So they [think they] have recruited philosophy with André Glucksmann or Bernard-Henri Lévy and literature with Christine Angot or Jean d'Ormesson". He asked voters to endorse the "left of the left," in an attempt to end a modern "anti-politics" which has become political marketing.

Personal life 
Debray was married to  Venezuelan Elizabeth Burgos; they had a daughter together, Laurence (born 1976).

Bibliography

Books
In French:
 Révolution dans la révolution ? : Lutte armée et lutte politique en Amérique latine [essai](Paris, Maspero, 1967, series: Cahiers libres)
 La Frontière, suivi de Un jeune homme à la page [littérature] (Paris, Le Seuil, 1967, series: Écrire)
 Nous les Tupamaros, suivi d'apprendre d'eux (Paris, Maspero, 1974, series: Cahiers libres)
 La guérilla du Che (Paris, Le Seuil, 1974, series: Histoire immédiate) 
 L'Indésirable [littérature](Paris, Le Seuil, 1975)
 Les rendez-vous manqués (pour Pierre Goldman) [littérature] (Paris, Le Seuil, 1975, series: Combats) 
 Journal d'un petit bourgeois entre deux feux et quatre murs [littérature] (Paris, Le Seuil, 1976)
 La neige brûle [littérature] (Paris, Grasset, 1977) Prix Femina
 Le pouvoir intellectuel en France (Paris, Ramsay, 1979)
 Critique de la raison politique (Paris, Gallimard, 1981, series: Bibliothèque des idées)
 La Puissance et les Rêves (Paris, Gallimard, 1984)
 Comète ma comète [littérature] (Paris, Gallimard, 1986)
 Christophe Colomb, le visiteur de l'aube, suivi des Traités de Tordesillas [littérature] (Paris, La Différence, 1991, series: Les voies du Sud: histoire)
 Contretemps : Eloge des idéaux perdus (Paris, Gallimard, 1992, series: Folio actuel)
 Trilogie "Le temps d'apprendre à vivre" I: Les Masques, une éducation amoureuse [littérature] (1992)
 Vie et mort de l'image : une histoire du regard en Occident (Paris, Gallimard, 1992, series: Folio actuel)
 L'État séducteur: les révolutions médiologiques du pouvoir (Paris, Gallimard, 1993)
 L'œil naïf (Paris, Le Seuil, 1994) 
 Manifestes medialogiques (Editions Gallimard, 1994)
 Contre Venise [littérature](Paris, Gallimard, 1995, series: Folio)
 A demain de Gaulle (Paris, Gallimard, 1996)
 La République expliquée à ma fille (Paris, Le 1998)
 L'abus monumental (Paris, Fayard, 1999, series: L'abus monumental) 
 Shangaï, dernières nouvelles [littérature] (Paris, Arléa, 1999)
 Trilogie "Le temps d'apprendre à vivre" II: Loués soient nos seigneurs, une éducation politique [littérature] (2000)
 Trilogie "Le temps d'apprendre à vivre" III: Par amour de l'art, une éducation intellectuelle [littérature] (2000)
 Dieu, un itinéraire : matériaux pour l'histoire de l'éternel en occident (Paris: Odile Jacob, 2001, series: Champ médiologique; Paris, Odile Jacob, 2003, series: Poches Odile Jacob; Prix Combourg 2003)
 L'Enseignement du fait religieux dans l'école laïque: rapport au ministre de l'Education nationale (Paris, Ministère de l'éducation nationale, 2002) 
 L'édit de Caracalla ou plaidoyer pour des Etats-Unis d'occident (Paris, Fayard, 2002). Written by Debray under pseudonym of "Xavier de C...". 
 Le Feu sacré : Fonction du religieux (Paris, Fayard, 2003)
 L'Ancien et le Nouveau Testament à travers 200 chefs-d'œuvre de la peinture (Paris, Presses de la Renaissance, 2003), 2 volumes: Tome I: L’Ancien testament à travers 100 chefs-d’œuvre de la peinture (2003); Tome II: Le Nouveau testament à travers 100 chefs-d’œuvre de la peinture (2003) 
 À l'ombre des lumières : Débat entre un philosophe et un scientifique (2003) (Entretien avec Jean Bricmont).
 Ce que nous voile le voile (Paris, Gallimard, 2004)
 Le plan vermeil: modeste proposition [littérature](Paris, Gallimard, 2004)
 Le siècle et la règle. Une correspondance avec le frère Gilles-Dominique o. p. (Paris, Fayard, 2004)
 Julien le Fidèle ou Le banquet des démons [théâtre] (Paris, Gallimard, 2005, series: NRF)
 Sur le pont d'Avignon (Paris, Flammarion, 2005, series: Café Voltaire)
 Les communions humaines (Paris, Fayard, 2005, series: Les dieux dans la Cité - Bibliothèque de culture religieuse)
 Supplique aux nouveaux progressistes du XXIe siècle (Paris, Gallimard, 2006) 
 Aveuglantes Lumières : journal en clair-obscur (Paris, Gallimard, 2006, series: NRF)
 Un candide en Terre sainte (Paris, Gallimard, 2008) 
 Dégagements (Paris, Gallimard, 2010)
 Que reste-t-il de l'occident ? (Paris, Grasset, 2014). Written by Debray and Renaud Girard.

In English:
 Revolution in the Revolution? Armed Struggle and Political Struggle in Latin America (London and New York, M.R. Press, 1967)
The Border & A Young Man in the Know (New York, Grove Press, 1968).
Media Manifestos: On the Technological Transmission of Cultural Forms (London, Verso, 1996).
Against Venice (Berkeley, Calif., North Atlantic Books, 1999; New York, Pushkin Press, 2001).
God: An Itinerary (New York, Verso, 2004).
Transmitting Culture (New York, Columbia University Press, 2004).
Empire 2.0: A Modest Proposal for a United States of the West by Xavier de C*** (Berkeley, California, North Atlantic Books, 2004)

Articles
 La Puissance et les Rêves: 3 Intermezzos, translated into English by Sian Reynolds, in Parker, Geoff (ed.), Cencrastus No. 19, Winter 1984, pp. 17 – 22, 
 "This Was an Intellectual". TELOS 44 (Summer 1980). New York: Telos Press

Reports
 Rapport au Ministre des affaires étrangères M. Dominique de Villepin du Comité indépendant de réflexion et de propositions sur les relations Franco-Haïtiennes - Janvier 2004

Reviews
 Maxwell, Stephen (1981), Le Pouvoir Intellectuel, review of Teachers, Writers and Celebrities: The Intellectuals of Modern France, in Murray, Glen (ed.), Cencrastus, No. 7, Winter 1981-82, pp. 41 & 42,

References

Further reading 
 Also published at pp. 467–488 of Guy Debord and the Situationist International: Texts and Documents. The MIT Press (1 April 2004);

External links

"Che’s Guerrilla War", 1973
Institut Européen en Sciences des Religions
Regis Debray - Revolution in the Revolution?
Official website (in French). Accessed 24 January 2023.
 Symposium Théâtre, religion, politique: Les liaisons dangereuses, Centre d’études et de recherches internationales de l'Université de Montréal, April the 12, 2007
 Communication and Transmission: Régis Debray ''Daily Times, January 18, 2010

Videos
Éloge du spectacle, 04/12/2007, Center for international research University of Montréal
Quelle éthique pour les relations Nord-Sud ? Politique humanitaire politique étrangère, convergences et divergences 04/14/2007,Center for international research University of Montréal
Dramaturgies engagées, un tabou ? 04/13/2007,Center for international research University of Montréal

1940 births
Living people
Writers from Paris
French academics
20th-century French journalists
21st-century French journalists
20th-century French writers
21st-century French writers
French agnostics
French communists
French philosophers
Marxist journalists
Guerrilla warfare theorists
Revolution theorists
École Normale Supérieure alumni
Lycée Louis-le-Grand alumni
French non-fiction writers
Prix Femina winners
Joseph Kessel Prize recipients
Che Guevara
Prix Décembre winners
Philosophers of technology
Mass media theorists
French male writers
Male non-fiction writers
Academic staff of University of Havana